Camlin may refer to:

Camlin Hotel, in Seattle, Washington
River Camlin, Irish river
Camlin, County Antrim, a townland and civil parish in County Antrim, Northern Ireland
Kokuyo Camlin, an Indian stationery company